The Congress of South African Trade Unions (COSATU or Cosatu) is a trade union federation in South Africa. It was founded in 1985 and is the largest of the country's three main trade union federations, with 21 affiliated trade unions.

History

Founding and early history
On 30 Nov 1985, 33 unions met at the University of Natal for talks on forming a federation of trade unions. This followed four years of unity talks between competing unions and federations that were opposed to apartheid and were "committed to a non-racial, non-sexist and democratic South Africa." COSATU was officially established on 1 December 1985. Among the founding unions were the affiliates of the Federation of South African Trade Unions (FOSATU), the small National Federation of Workers, and some independent unions, notably the National Union of Mineworkers. Elijah Barayi was the organisation's first president and Jay Naidoo the first general secretary.

Several resolutions were passed at this first meeting that defined the aim of the federation and how the federation operates, namely:
 To establish one union for each industry within six months.
 To focus on the exploitation of women workers.
 To call for the lifting of the state of emergency, withdrawal of troops from the townships and release of all political prisoners.
 To continue the call for international pressure, including disinvestment.
 To demand for the right to strike and picket.
 To determine a national minimum wage.
 To extend the struggle for trade union rights in the homelands.

On 5–6 May 1987 a strike as part of COSATU's Living Wage Campaign was held coinciding with 1987 General Election. More than 2.5 million workers took part in the stay-away. On 7 May 1987, in the early hours of the morning two bombs exploded near the support columns in the basement of the federation headquarters, COSATU House. The resulting damage caused the building to be declared unsafe.

Fight against Apartheid
At the second national congress held from 14 to 18 July 1987, the Freedom Charter was adopted by the federation after the resolution was proposed by the National Union of Mineworkers

At the third congress held from 12 to 16 July 1989, a resolution was adopted that called on the members of COSATU to join a campaign of "sustained action" against apartheid, in the week leading up to the 1989 General Election of South Africa.

On 26 July 1989, COSATU, the United Democratic Front and the Mass Democratic Movement, instigated the National Defiance Campaign, in which facilities reserved for whites were invaded, and organisation that had been banned by the state declared themselves 'unbanned'.

Post apartheid activities

The COSATU congress decided in 2012 to affiliate with the class-struggle oriented World Federation of Trade Unions, while maintaining its membership within the International Trade Union Confederation.

During the 2016 congress that was held in Durban, Michael Mzwandile Makwayiba, president of COSATU affiliate NEHAWU Michael Mzwandile Makwayiba was elected President of the World Federation of Trade Unions.

Cosatu experienced a large drop in membership after 2012, although it remained the largest trade union federation.

Affiliates

Current affiliates
The following unions were listed by COSATU as their affiliates:

Former affiliates

Expulsion of the National Union of Metalworkers of South Africa
On 8 November 2014, Irvin Jim, the general secretary of the largest COSATU affiliate, the National Union of Metalworkers of South Africa (NUMSA), announced that the union had been expelled from the COSATU after a vote at a special central executive committee had been convened resulting in a 33–24 vote in favour of the expulsion. NUMSA was charged with violating the constitution of COSATU

On 6 November 2014, an urgent legal application by NUMSA to prevent the special central executive committee from being convened was postponed by South Gauteng High Court, thus allowing the meeting to take place.

On 10 November 2014, 7 unions announced they were voluntarily suspending their participation in COSATU's decision-making bodies due to the expulsion of NUMSA and called for a special national congress to be convened.

Irvin Jim described the expulsion as "a dark day for workers".

Government
COSATU is part of an alliance with the ANC and the South African Communist Party, called the Tripartite Alliance. COSATU's role in the alliance has been the subject of debate, since the organisation has been critical of some of the ANC government's policies. While some affiliates have argued for greater independence from the ruling political party, others have argued that the arrangement gives COSATU a political influence beneficial to its members."

Labour and social movements

South Africa has one of the largest incidence of HIV/AIDS in the world, with a 2005 estimate of 5.5-million people living with HIV – 12.4% of the population. In 2020, around 20.6-million people in eastern and southern Africa were living with HIV. The trade union movement has taken a role in combating this pandemic. COSATU is a key partner in the Treatment Action Campaign (TAC), a registered charity and political force working to educate and promote understanding about HIV/AIDS, and to prevent new infections, as well as push for greater access to antiretrovirals. In 1998, COSATU passed a resolution to campaign for treatment. "It was clear to the labour movement at that time that its lowest paid members were dying because they couldn’t afford medicines", says Theodora Steel, Campaigns Coordinator at COSATU. "We saw TAC as a natural ally
in a campaign for treatment. We passed a formal resolution at our congress to assist and build TAC.

Notwithstanding the formal alliance of COSATU with the ruling ANC party, it has been at odds with the government, calling for the roll-out of comprehensive public access to antiretroviral drugs.

Abahlali baseMjondolo offered a strong statement of support to the 2010 Public Sector Worker's strike.

Logo
The wheel in the logo represents the economy. The gold colour of the wheel represents the wealth of the country. The figures pushing the wheel, consisting of two men and a woman carrying a baby, represent the challenges that workers face namely, racial and gender oppression as well as economic exploitation. These figures are black as they represent the black majorities struggle against racial oppression. The figures are holding a red flag that represents the working class.

The slogan on the logo is "An injury to one is an injury to all" signifies the vision the union has of social solidarity that binds the working class.

Zimbabwe

In October 2004 and February 2005 COSATU sent delegations to Zimbabwe to judge conditions in that country before the 2005 Zimbabwe parliamentary elections. They were expelled from the country on both occasions.

COSATU has arranged protests and border blockades against the regime in Harare.

In 2016, COSATU voiced support for #ThisFlag protestors in Zimbabwe, stating "heavy-handedness of the Zanu-PF regime in dealing with perceived enemies was similar to that of Operation Restore Order/Murambatsvina in 2005."

Palestine activism 
In 2020 COSATU voiced their solidarity with Palestinian peoples on 15 May (Nakba Day) and have linked the Palestinian right to land to COSATU's struggle against apartheid in South Africa. In 2021 Palestinians protested against an Israeli court ruling which stated that residents of Sheik Jarrah need to be evicted from their homes in Jerusalem. Israeli troops attacked Al-Aqsa Mosque during Ramadan, a holy month for many Palestinians. COSATU marched to the US Embassy in Sandton, Johannesburg as a show of support for Palestinians, stating that the US government needs to recognize the sovereignty of Palestine as well as the gross human rights violations against Palestinians.

Current officeholders
National Office Bearers:
 President: Zingiswa Losi
 First Deputy-President: Mike Shingange
 Second Deputy-President: Louise Thipe
 Secretary General: Bheki Ntshalintshali
 Deputy General Secretary: Solly Phetoe
 Treasurer: Freda Oosthuysen

Provincial Secretaries:
 Eastern Cape: Xolani Malamlela
 Free State: Monyatso Mahlatsi
 Gauteng: Dumisani Dakile
 KwaZulu-Natal: Edwin Mkhize
 Limpopo: Gerald Twala
 Mpumalanga: Thabo Mokoena
 North West: Job Dliso
 Northern Cape: Orapeleng Moraladi
 Western Cape: Melvyn de Bryn

See also 

 Trade unions in South Africa
 2007 South African public servants' strike
 Siphiwe Mvuyane
 John Gomomo

Further reading 
 Jeremy Baskin, Striking Back: A history of Cosatu, Routledge (September 1991), an account of COSATU's early years from 1985 until the release of Nelson Mandela in 1990

Notes

References

External links
 Official homepage
 COSATU Daily News
cosatu Twitter @_cosatu
 COSATU Press Releases
 South Africa Info: Trade Unions in South Africa

 
Trade unions based in Johannesburg
Trade unions in South Africa
Politics of South Africa
Political organisations based in South Africa
African Regional Organisation of the International Trade Union Confederation
1985 establishments in South Africa
National trade union centres of South Africa
Trade unions established in 1985